Adelpherupa albescens is a species of moth of the family Crambidae. It is found in the Democratic Republic of Congo, Kenya and Malawi.

References

Moths described in 1919
Schoenobiinae
Moths of Africa